Steffen Fetzner is a male former table tennis player from Germany. From 1989 to 2000 he won several medals in doubles, and team events in the Table Tennis European Championships, in the World Table Tennis Championships, and in the Table Tennis World Cup. He also won a silver medal in the Olympic Games at Barcelona 1992.

Career
Fetzner represented Germany a total of 206 times during his playing career. He took part in three Olympic Games and seven World and European Championships.

After retirement, he took up a head coach role at Aspire Academy in May 2007.

References

1968 births
Living people
Olympic medalists in table tennis
German male table tennis players
German table tennis coaches
Sportspeople from Karlsruhe
Olympic silver medalists for Germany
Olympic table tennis players of Germany
Olympic table tennis players of West Germany
Medalists at the 1992 Summer Olympics
Table tennis players at the 1988 Summer Olympics
Table tennis players at the 1992 Summer Olympics
Table tennis players at the 1996 Summer Olympics